Ingegerd Saarinen (born 1947) is a Swedish Green Party politician. She was a member of the Riksdag from 1999 to 2006.

External links
Ingegerd Saarinen at the Riksdag website

1947 births
20th-century Swedish women politicians
21st-century Swedish women politicians
Living people
Members of the Riksdag 1998–2002
Members of the Riksdag 2002–2006
Members of the Riksdag from the Green Party
Women members of the Riksdag